Chakirevulapalem is a village in Rowthulapudi Mandal, Kakinada district in the state of Andhra Pradesh in India.

Geography 

Demographics 
 India census, Chakirevulapalem had a population of 155, out of which 64 were male and 91 were female. Population of children below 6 years of age were 16. The literacy rate of the village is 45.32%.

References 

Villages in Rowthulapudi mandal